Gambia Armed Forces Football Club is a Gambian football club located in Banjul, Gambia. It currently plays in GFA League First Division.

Titles
GFA League First Division: 3
2003, 2009, 2017.

Gambian Cup: 1
2018.

Gambian Super Cup: 3
2004, 2009, 2018.

Performance in CAF competitions
CAF Champions League: 1 appearance
2010 – Preliminary Round

External links
Team profile – Soccerway.com

Football clubs in the Gambia
Military association football clubs